The University of Florida Investment Corporation (UFICO) is a wholly owned subsidiary of the University of Florida, charged with managing the university's endowment, foundations, research endeavors, and the University Athletic Association.

This organization is governed by their own board of directors, which are appointed by the University of Florida Board of Trustees. The trustees chose Earl W. Powell in 2004 to be the chairman.

See also
 University of Florida Alumni Association
 Board of Trustees at the University of Florida

References

External links
 Official website

University of Florida
2004 establishments in Florida